The Fundamentals is the eleventh studio album by American rapper Juvenile. The album was released on February 18, 2014, by Rap-A-Lot Records.

Critical response

The Fundamentals was met with mixed reviews from music critics. Steven Goldstein of HipHopDX gave the album two out of five stars, saying "Even with the new attention it’s receiving, The Fundamentals is forgettable at best." Max Goldberg of XXL gave the album an M, saying "Ultimately, the album’s title feels ironic. The Fundamentals struggles because Juvenile failed to tap into the skills that made him so exciting back in the day." David Jeffries of AllMusic gave the album three out of four stars, saying "With enough hooks to fill a bait shop, Juvenile's 11th studio effort does cross the finish line with the required amount of highlights to recommend to fans."

Track listing

Charts

References

2014 albums
Juvenile (rapper) albums
Rap-A-Lot Records albums